The First Barons' War (1215–1217) was a civil war in the Kingdom of England in which a group of rebellious major landowners (commonly referred to as barons) led by Robert Fitzwalter waged war against King John of England. The conflict resulted from King John's disastrous wars against King Philip II of France, which led to the collapse of the Angevin Empire, and John's subsequent refusal to accept and abide Magna Carta, which John had sealed on 15 June 1215.

The rebellious barons, faced with an uncompromising king, turned to King Philip's son, Prince Louis, who, in 1216, then sailed to England with an army despite his father's disapproval, as well as the Pope's, who subsequently excommunicated him. Louis captured Winchester and soon controlled over half of the English kingdom. He was proclaimed "King of England" in London by the barons, although never actually crowned.

Louis' ambitions of ruling England faced a major setback in October 1216, when King John's death led to the rebellious barons deserting him in favour of John's nine-year-old son, Henry III of England and the war dragged on. Louis' army was finally beaten at the Battle of Lincoln on 20 May 1217. Also, after a fleet assembled by his wife, Blanche of Castile, attempted to bring him French reinforcements but was defeated off the coast of Sandwich on 24 August 1217, he was forced to make peace on English terms. He signed the Treaty of Lambeth and surrendered the few remaining castles that he held. The treaty had the effect of Prince Louis agreeing he had never been the legitimate king of England. That formalised the end of the civil war and the departure of the French from England.

Background
King John in June 1215 was forced to put his seal to "The Articles of the Barons" by a group of powerful barons who could no longer stand John's failed leadership and despotic rule. The king's Great Seal was attached to it on 15 June 1215. In return, the barons renewed their oaths of fealty to King John on 19 July 1215. A formal document to record the agreement was created by the royal chancery on 15 July: this was the original Magna Carta. "The law of the land" is one of the great watchwords of Magna Carta by standing in opposition to the king's mere will.

The Magna Carta of 1215 contained clauses that theoretically noticeably reduced the power of the king, such as Clause 61, the "security clause", which allowed a group of 25 barons to override the king at any time by way of force, a medieval legal process called distraint that was normal in feudal relationships but had never been applied to a king. After a few months of half-hearted attempts to negotiate in the summer of 1215, open warfare broke out between the rebel barons and the king and his supporters.

Course of events

French intervention
The war began over Magna Carta but quickly turned into a dynastic war for the throne of England. The rebel barons, faced with a powerful king, turned to Louis, the son and heir apparent of King Philip II of France and the grandson-in-law of King Henry II of England. The Norman invasion had occurred only 149 years before, and the relationship between England and France was not as simply adversarial as it later became. The contemporary document, the Annals of Waverley saw no contradiction in stating that Louis was invited to invade to "prevent the realm being pillaged by aliens."

At first, in November 1215, Louis simply sent the barons a contingent of knights to protect London. However, even at that stage he also agreed to an open invasion, despite the discouragement from his father and from Pope Innocent III. That came in May 1216, when watchmen on the coast of Thanet detected sails on the horizon, and on the next day, the King of England and his armies saw Louis's troops disembark on the coast of Kent.

John decided to escape to the Saxon capital of Winchester, and so Louis had little resistance on his march to London. He entered London, also with little resistance, and was openly received by the rebel barons and citizens of London and proclaimed (though not crowned) king at St Paul's Cathedral. Many nobles gathered to give homage to him, including Alexander II of Scotland, who held fiefs in England.

Many of John's supporters, sensing a tide of change, moved to support the barons. Gerald of Wales remarked: "The madness of slavery is over, the time of liberty has been granted, English necks are free from the yoke."

Pursuing John, Louis led his army south from London on 6 June, arriving the following day in Reigate where he found the castle abandoned. He moved onwards to Guildford Castle on 8 June, which surrendered immediately. Farnham Castle initially closed its gates but surrendered as the French started to lay siege. He met resistance only when he reached Winchester Castle on 14 June, but it fell after a ten-day siege. Louis' campaign continued, and by July, about a third of England had fallen under his control.

First siege of Dover
In the meantime, the King of France taunted his son for trying to conquer England without first seizing its key port: Dover. The royal castles at Canterbury and Rochester, their towns, and indeed, most of Kent had already fallen to Louis. However, when he moved on to Dover Castle on 25 July, it was prepared. Its constable, Hubert de Burgh, had a well-supplied garrison of men.

The first siege began on 19 July, with Louis taking the high ground to the north of the castle. His men successfully undermined the barbican and attempted to topple the castle gate, but De Burgh's men managed to repel the invaders, blocking the breach in the walls with giant timbers. (After the siege the weak northern gate was blocked and tunnels were built in that area, to St John's Tower, and the new Constable's Gate and Fitzwilliam's Gate.) In the meantime, Louis's occupation of Kent was being undermined by a guerrilla force of Wealden archers raised and led by William of Cassingham.

After three months spent besieging the castle and a large part of his forces being diverted by the siege, Louis called a truce on 14 October and soon returned to London.

Sieges of Windsor and Rochester
Apart from Dover, the only castle to hold out against Louis was that at Windsor, where 60 loyalist knights survived a two-month siege, despite severe damage to the structure of its lower ward. That was immediately repaired in 1216 by Henry III, who further strengthened the defences with the construction of the western curtain wall, much of which survives today. The damage was caused possibly by the castle having been besieged by the barons in 1189, less than 30 years earlier.

In 1206, John had spent £115 on repairs to Rochester Castle, and he had even preemptively held it during the year of the negotiations leading up to Magna Carta, but the Charter's terms had forced him to hand it back into the custody of Stephen Langton, Archbishop of Canterbury, in May 1215. The rebel barons had then sent troops under William d'Aubigny to the castle, to whom its constable Reginald de Cornhill opened the castle's gates. Thus, during October 1215 on his marching from Dover to London, John found Rochester in his way and on 11 October began besieging it in person.

The rebels were expecting reinforcements from London but John sent fire ships out to burn their route in, the city's bridge over the Medway. Robert Fitzwalter rode out to stop the king and fought his way onto the bridge but eventually being beaten back into the castle. John also sacked the cathedral, took anything of value and stabled his horses in it, all as a slight to Langton. Orders were then sent to the men of Canterbury.

After that five siege engines were erected, and work was carried out to undermine the curtain wall. By one of those means, the king's forces entered and held the bailey in early November, and began attempting the same tactics against the keep, including undermining the south-eastern tower. The mine-roof was supported by wooden props, which were then set alight using pig-fat. On 25 November 1215, John had sent a writ to the justiciars saying, "Send to us with all speed by day and night, forty of the fattest pigs of the sort least good for eating so that we may bring fire beneath the castle". The fire thus created caused one entire corner of the keep to collapse. The rebels withdrew behind the keep's cross-wall but still managed to hold out. A few were allowed to leave the castle but on John's orders had their hands and feet lopped off as an example.

Winter was now setting in, and the castle was taken on 30 November by starvation and not by force. John set up a memorial to the pigs and a gallows with the intention of hanging the whole garrison, but one of his captains, Savari de Mauléon, persuaded him not to hang the rebels since hanging those who had surrendered would set a precedent if John ever surrendered; only one man was actually hanged (a young bowman who had previously been in John's service). The remainder of the rebel barons were taken away and imprisoned at various royal-held castles, such as Corfe Castle. Of the siege, the Barnwell chronicler wrote "No one alive can remember a siege so fiercely pressed and so manfully resisted" and that, after it, "There were few who would put their trust in castles".

Death of King John
On 18 October 1216, John contracted dysentery, which would ultimately prove fatal. He died at Newark Castle, Nottinghamshire, and with him the main reason for the fighting. Louis now seemed much more of a threat to baronial interests than John's nine-year-old son, Prince Henry.

John had killed Prince Arthur, son of his late elder brother, Geoffrey, during the struggles for the throne, with Princess Eleanor sister of Arthur imprisoned. In his will, John ordered Eleanor never be released; despite being an adult, she remained in prison with her claim ignored.

Pierre des Roches, Bishop of Winchester, and a number of barons rushed to have the young Henry be crowned as King of England. London was held by Louis (it was his seat of government) and therefore could not be used for this coronation so, on 28 October 1216, they brought the boy from the castle at Devizes to Gloucester Abbey in front of a small attendance presided over by a Papal Legate, Guala Bicchieri (d. 1227, Bishop of Vercelli, papal legate in England 1216–18). They crowned Henry with a necklace of gold.

On 12 November 1216, Magna Carta was reissued in Henry's name with some of the clauses omitted, including clause 61. The revised charter was sealed by the young king's regent William Marshal. A great deal of the country was loyal to Prince Louis, with the southwest of England and the Midlands favouring Henry. Marshal was highly respected and he asked the barons not to blame the child Henry for his father's sins. The prevailing sentiment, helped by self-interest, disliked the idea of depriving a boy of his inheritance. Marshal also promised that he and the other regents would rule by Magna Carta. Furthermore, he managed to get support from the Pope, who had already excommunicated Louis.

Louis' losses

William Marshal slowly managed to get most barons to switch sides from Louis to Henry and attack Louis. The two opposing sides fought for about a year. On 6 December 1216 Louis took Hertford Castle but allowed the defending knights to leave with their horses and weapons. He then took Berkhamsted Castle in late December, which again allowed the royal garrison to withdraw honourably with their horses and weapons.

By early 1217, Louis decided to return to France for reinforcements. He had to fight his way to the south coast through loyalist resistance in Kent and Sussex, losing part of his force in an ambush at Lewes, with the remainder pursued to Winchelsea and were saved from starvation only by the arrival of a French fleet.

Since the truce had been arranged with Dover, the Dover garrison had repeatedly disrupted Louis's communication with France, and so Louis sailed back to Dover to begin a second siege. The French camp, set up outside Dover Castle in anticipation of the new siege, was attacked and burned by William of Cassingham and Oliver fitz Regis just as the fleet carrying the reinforcements arrived. Louis was forced to land at Sandwich and march to Dover, where he began a second siege in earnest on 12 May 1217. This new siege diverted so much of Louis's forces that Marshal and Falkes de Breauté were able to attack and heavily defeat pro-Louis barons at Lincoln Castle on 15 May or 20 May 1217, in what became known as the Second Battle of Lincoln.

Marshal prepared for a siege against London next. In the meantime, Louis suffered two more heavy defeats, this time at sea, at the Battle of Dover and Battle of Sandwich in the Straits of Dover, this time at the hands of William's ally and Dover's constable Hubert de Burgh. Louis' new reinforcement convoy, under Eustace the Monk, was destroyed, making it nearly impossible for Louis to continue fighting.

Aftermath
After a year and a half of war, most of the rebellious barons had defected. That and the defeat of the French in 1217 forced Louis to negotiate. A few of Henry's supporters held out for unconditional surrender, but the Earl of Pembroke successfully argued for the more moderate terms.

At the Treaty of Lambeth, which was signed on 11 September 1217, Louis had to give up his claim to be the King of England and to agree that he had never been the legitimate king. The principal provisions of the treaties were an amnesty for English rebels but that the barons who had joined Louis had to pay the French prince 10,000 marks to expedite his withdrawal. Louis surrendered the few remaining castles that he had held and exhorted to his allies, Scottish and Welsh troops under Alexander II and Llywelyn the Great respectively, to lay down their arms. Louis also undertook not to attack England again.

Museums
 "The 1216 Experience" at Dover Castle (in the keep, rather than at the site of the siege at the north gate) recounts the two sieges and Battle of Sandwich, and there is also material on them at the town museum.
 Rochester City Museum contains a model of the castle keep under siege.

See also
 Second Barons' War

References

Notes

Citations

Sources
 
 
 
 
 Salter, Mike (2000). The Castles of Kent. Folly Publications, Malvern.

Siege of Dover
 Photos and article
  (the online version lacks the diagrams of the print version)

1
13th-century rebellions
Invasions of England
Conflicts in 1215
Conflicts in 1216
Conflicts in 1217
1215 in England
1216 in England
1217 in England
1210s in France
1210s in England
Anglo-French wars
Louis VIII of France
13th-century military history of the Kingdom of England
13th-century military history of France
Wars of succession involving the states and peoples of Europe